Dalaketnon (not to be confused with Dalaguetenon, the Cebuano term for natives from the city of Dalaguete), are the evil engkanto. Dalaketnons  are a race of Elf-like creatures in Philippine mythology In Visayans they were believed to be handsome and beautiful creatures that resemble nobles and monarchs of the prehispanic Philippines, They dwell on Dalakit trees (Balete, Dakit) hence the name Dalakitnon which literally means From the Dalakit or Dakit tree
These mythological race exhibits sexual dimorphism the men having light colored skin and very dark hair and women having bronze-brown skin and brown hair. Stories say that they have leaf-shaped pointy ears. depicted in modern times as gothic-like tall, handsome males and beautiful females. They dress in fashionable manner, live in the "haunted house-like" mansions and try to fit in with mortal people. Some believe that the only way to Dalaket, their dwelling place, is by entering the Dalaket trees. These creatures abduct people and take them to their world. They hold a feast for their victims and force them to eat the Black Rice that put them under their spell making them their slaves.

Dalaketnons were known to be rather beautiful elitists. They have a bit of a coño, a kind of telekinesis as well as corporeal duplication—meaning they could generate tangible, living copies of themselves indefinitely, and their hairs and eyes turn white whenever their power manifests.

The Dalaketnons have a normal contact with humans but the humans do not know that they are engkanto. Old folks believed that Dalaketnons can change an ordinary human into creatures like them. They use a magical black rice to change their victims into a Dalaketnon. It was also believed that they were the mortal enemies of the good engkanto. They are from the royal blood of evil engkantos that served as their ruler. They were associated to be the masters of Tiyanak, Aswang, Bal-Bal, Wak Wak, Manananggal, Amalanhig, and even Tiktik.

References

Visayan mythology
Philippine demons
Mythic humanoids